Randall Asher Wojciechowski (born December 21, 1988) is an American former professional baseball pitcher. He played in Major League Baseball (MLB) for the Houston Astros, Cincinnati Reds, Baltimore Orioles, and New York Yankees.

Early life
Wojciechowski was born in Hardeeville, South Carolina. In his younger years, he lived in Pensacola, Florida, Sturgis, Michigan, and the Dominican Republic. The Wojciechowskis moved to Romania when Asher was nine. Living abroad, he played soccer, and joined Little League Baseball when it expanded to Bucharest when he was 11. The team played in a tournament similar to the Little League World Series in Poland.

After living in Romania for three years, the family moved to Sturgis, Michigan. Wojciechowski attended Sturgis High School, where he played for the school's baseball team. He also played high school football for one season. The family moved to South Carolina for Asher's senior year of high school, so that he could attract more attention from scouts. Wojciechowski attended Beaufort High School in Beaufort, South Carolina, for his senior year of high school.

After graduating from high school, Wojciechowski then enrolled at The Citadel, choosing it over Winthrop University. He competed for the United States national baseball team in the summer of 2009. In 2010, he was named the Southern Conference's pitcher of the year.

Professional career

Toronto Blue Jays
The Toronto Blue Jays selected Wojciechowski in the first round, with the 41st overall selection, of the 2010 Major League Baseball draft. He received an $815,000 signing bonus, and made his professional debut with the Auburn Doubledays of the Class A-Short Season New York–Penn League. In 2011, Wojciechowski played for the Dunedin Blue Jays of the Class A-Advanced Florida State League. The Blue Jays assigned Wojciechowski to Dunedin in 2012.

Houston Astros

The Blue Jays later traded Wojciechowski, along with Ben Francisco, Francisco Cordero, David Rollins, Joe Musgrove, Carlos Pérez, and a player to be named later (Kevin Comer) to the Houston Astros on July 20, 2012, in exchange for J. A. Happ, Brandon Lyon, and David Carpenter. Houston assigned Wojciechowski to the Corpus Christi Hooks of the Class AA Texas League. He started the 2013 season in Corpus Christi, but received a midseason promotion to the Oklahoma City RedHawks of the Class AAA Pacific Coast League. He was added to the 40-man roster on November 20, 2013. Before spring training began in 2014, Wojciechowski strained a lateral muscle. While recuperating in May, his return was delayed when he strained his forearm. He returned to Oklahoma City in June.

Wojciechowski began the 2015 season in the Astros' starting rotation. He made 5 appearances for the Astros in the 2015 season, 3 of which were starts, and pitched to a 0–1 record, 7.16 ERA, and 16 strikeouts in 16 innings. He was designated for assignment on May 17, 2016.

Miami Marlins
On May 24, Wojciechowski was claimed off waivers by the Miami Marlins. Wojciechowski was designated for assignment on July 16, 2016. He elected free agency on November 7, 2016.

Arizona Diamondbacks
On December 12, 2016, Wojciechowski signed a minor league contract with the Arizona Diamondbacks. The Diamondbacks released him towards the end of spring training in 2017.

Cincinnati Reds
On April 20, 2017, Wojciechowski signed a minor league contract with the Cincinnati Reds. He began the season with the Louisville Bats of the Class AAA International League. On May 20, 2017, the Reds selected Wojciechowski's contract. Wojciechowski earned his first MLB win that day over the Colorado Rockies. Wojciechowski pitched  innings while allowing one hit and striking out three. He elected free agency on October 6, 2017. He would appear in 25 games for the Reds that season, collecting 6 wins against 4 losses. His E.R.A was 6.50, while appearing as both a starting pitcher and relief pitcher.

Baltimore Orioles
On December 1, 2017, Wojciechowski signed a minor league contract with the Baltimore Orioles. He was assigned to the Norfolk Tides of the International League for the 2018 season. On July 18, Wojciechowski opted-out of his contract and became a free agent.

Chicago White Sox
On July 25, 2018, Wojciechowski signed a minor league contract with the Chicago White Sox, and was assigned to the team's Triple-A affiliate Charlotte Knights. He elected free agency on November 2, 2018.

Cleveland Indians
Wojciechowski signed a minor league contract with the Cleveland Indians on February 14, 2019. The deal included an invitation to the Indians' major league spring training camp. Wojciechowski spent the first half of the 2019 season with the Columbus Clippers, going 8–2 with a 3.61 ERA in 15 starts.

Baltimore Orioles (second stint)
Wojciechowski returned to the Orioles in a cash transaction with the Indians on July 1, 2019 and was assigned back to the Tides. On July 2, the Orioles selected his contract and promoted him to the major league roster. Starting 16 of 17 pitching appearances, he had a 4–8 record with a 4.92 ERA and 1.312 WHIP. On September 17, 2020, the Orioles designated Wojciechowski for assignment. On October 14, 2020, Wojciechowski elected free agency.

New York Yankees
On January 21, 2021, Wojciechowski signed a minor league contract with the New York Yankees organization and was invited to spring training. Wojciechowski left a spring training outing with lat discomfort, and missed the first month of the minor league season before making his season debut with the Triple-A Scranton/Wilkes-Barre RailRiders in June. On July 21, the Yankees selected Wojciechowski to the majors to start against the Philadelphia Phillies. In his only start for the Yankees, Wojciechowski pitched 4 innings, gave up 2 runs, and struck out 4 batters. He was designated for assignment the following day. On July 24, Wojciechowski was outrighted to Triple-A Scranton, but rejected the assignment and elected free agency.

Seattle Mariners

On July 29, 2021 Wojciechowski signed a minor league contract with the Seattle Mariners. Wojciechowski made 5 starts in 2021 for the Triple-A Tacoma Rainiers, going 0–1 with a 5.82 ERA and 27 strikeouts. He returned to Triple-A Tacoma for 2022. He made 9 appearances, going 0–4 with an 8.77 ERA and 23 strikeouts. On June 5, 2022, Wojciechowski was released by the Mariners.

Pitching style

Personal life
Wojciechowski is married to his wife, Alanna. His father-in-law is American football coach Paul Hamilton.

References

External links

1988 births
Living people
People from Hardeeville, South Carolina
Baseball players from South Carolina
American people of Polish descent
Major League Baseball pitchers
Houston Astros players
Cincinnati Reds players
Baltimore Orioles players
New York Yankees players
The Citadel Bulldogs baseball players
Auburn Doubledays players
Dunedin Blue Jays players
Corpus Christi Hooks players
Oklahoma City RedHawks players
American expatriates in Romania
American expatriates in the Dominican Republic
Fresno Grizzlies players
Jacksonville Suns players
New Orleans Zephyrs players
Louisville Bats players
People from Sturgis, Michigan
Norfolk Tides players
Charlotte Knights players
Columbus Clippers players
Scranton/Wilkes-Barre RailRiders players
Tacoma Rainiers players